Eisa Palangi (born 21 February 1999) is a professional footballer who plays as a forward for Qatar SC. Born in Iran, he has represented Qatar at youth level.

References

Qatari footballers
Association football forwards
1999 births
Living people
Qatar SC players
Qatar Stars League players
Qatari people of Iranian descent
Sportspeople of Iranian descent
Naturalised citizens of Qatar
Qatar under-20 international footballers